Diamonds Are Forever, So Are Morals is a biography of Govind Dholakia who is an entrepreneur, founder and the chairman of  Shree Ramkrishna Exports Pvt. Ltd. The book is written by an engineer-scientist Arun Tiwari and educationalist Kamlesh Yagnik. The book was released by Penguin Random House India in 24 March 2022.

Reception
The Hindu Business Line wrote in a review "The life story of diamond baron, Govindbhai Dholakia, 73, gives an inspiring insight about a common man’s triumph in realising the dreams."

The Asian Age wrote in a review "After reading the biography, one is left marvelling at the obvious wisdom of this singularly successful individual, who spawned a sprawling enterprise and an equally large extended family comprising about 1,500 members.

The Outlook India wrote in a review "The autobiography treads a fine balance between Dholakia’s spiritual self and his work karma and will certainly intrigue some young get rich quick entrepreneurs to flip through it."

References 

2022 debut novels
21st-century Indian books
Indian biographies